The 1992 Maryland Terrapins football team represented the University of Maryland in the 1992 NCAA Division I-A football season. In their first season under head coach Mark Duffner, the Terrapins compiled a 3–8 record, finished in eighth place in the Atlantic Coast Conference, and were outscored by their opponents 365 to 292. The team's statistical leaders included John Kaleo with 3,392 passing yards, Mark Mason with 523 rushing yards, and Marcus Badgett with 1,240 receiving yards.

Schedule

Roster

References

Maryland
Maryland Terrapins football seasons
Maryland Terrapins football